Ivan Vyacheslavovich Belyayev (born 26 May 1986) is a former Russian professional football player.

Club career
He played made one appearance in the German 3. Liga for Holstein Kiel on 12 September 2009 in a 0–3 loss to Dynamo Dresden.

References

External links
 
 

1986 births
Living people
Russian footballers
Association football goalkeepers
Holstein Kiel players
Holstein Kiel II players
3. Liga players
Oberliga (football) players
Russian expatriate footballers
Expatriate footballers in Germany